Kai Olav Ryen (born 10 September 1978) is a Norwegian former footballer who played as a defender.

He hails from Eidskog and played for Magnor UL and Eidskog Fotball, then joined Kongsvinger IL ahead of the 2002 season. The club played in the Second Division. In 2010, he made his debut in the Norwegian Premier League. He retired after the 2013 season.

References

1978 births
Living people
People from Tynset
Norwegian footballers
Kongsvinger IL Toppfotball players
Eliteserien players
Norwegian First Division players
Norwegian Second Division players
Association football defenders
Sportspeople from Innlandet